Jacey Murphy (born March 21, 1989) is a Canadian rugby union player. She represented  at the 2014 Women's Rugby World Cup, and 2017 Women's Rugby World Cup.
She made her debut at the 2013 Nations Cup against .

On July 2, 2019, nine months after giving birth to her first child, Grusnick played for Canada against France at the Super Series.

Murphy attended the University of Guelph. She works as an administrative assistant.

References

External links
 Rugby Canada Player Profile 

1989 births
Living people
Canadian female rugby union players
Canada women's international rugby union players
Female rugby union players
Place of birth missing (living people)
University of Guelph alumni